The United States District Court for the District of New Mexico (in case citations, D.N.M.) is the federal district court whose jurisdiction comprises the state of New Mexico. Court is held in Albuquerque, Las Cruces, Las Vegas, Roswell, Santa Fe, and Silver City.

Appeals from the District of New Mexico are taken to the United States Court of Appeals for the Tenth Circuit (except for patent claims and claims against the U.S. government under the Tucker Act, which are appealed to the Federal Circuit).

The United States Attorney's Office for the District of New Mexico represents the United States in civil and criminal litigation in the court. The current United States Attorney is Alexander M.M. Uballez since May 24, 2022.

Along with the Western District of Texas, Southern District of Texas, and District of Arizona, it is one of the busiest district courts in terms of criminal felony filings.

Current judges 
:

Former judges

Chief judges

Succession of seats

List of U.S. Attorneys 
 Summers Burkhart (1913–1921)
 Norman Bay (2000–2001)
 David Iglesias (2001–2006)
 Larry Gomez (2006–2008)
 Gregory J. Fouratt (2008–2010)
 Kenneth John Gonzales (2010–2013)
 Damon Martinez (2014–2017)
 John C. Anderson (2018–2021)
 Fred Joseph Federici III (acting) (2021–2022)
 Alexander M.M. Uballez (2022–present)

See also 
 Courts of New Mexico
 List of current United States district judges
 List of United States federal courthouses in New Mexico

References

External links 
 United States District Court for the District of New Mexico Official Website
 United States Attorney for the District of New Mexico Official Website

New Mexico
New Mexico law
Organizations based in Albuquerque, New Mexico
Las Cruces, New Mexico
San Miguel County, New Mexico
Roswell, New Mexico
Santa Fe, New Mexico
Grant County, New Mexico
Courthouses in New Mexico
1910 establishments in New Mexico Territory
Courts and tribunals established in 1910